The women's eight competition at the 1984 Summer Olympics took place at Lake Casitas, California, United States of America.

With only 6 boats in the competition, a single race was held.

Results

The Romanian women had dominated the 1984 rowing competitions to this point, winning every race in each of the other events (single sculls, double sculls, quadruple sculls, coxless pair, and coxed four). The eight was the last race held, and "turned out to be surprisingly entertaining and competitive." The Romanians held a small lead over the Americans at the halfway mark, crossing at 1:29.28 to the United States' 1:29.62. But the Americans had a strong second half, breaking the finish line under the 3 minute mark—a feat which had not been accomplished before in Olympic history (the Soviets had come closest, with 3:00.19 in the first heat of the 1976 eight competition). The Romanians were not far behind, earning silver. There was also a closely contested race for the bronze medal between the Dutch and the Canadians; the former held off the latter. Great Britain started strong, running third at the halfway mark, before dropping back to fifth. West Germany came in sixth, over 5 seconds behind the Brits.

References

Rowing at the 1984 Summer Olympics
Women's rowing at the 1984 Summer Olympics